Jean-Baptiste Roman (31 October 1792 – 13 February 1835) was a French sculptor. He was born and died in Paris. Among his works is a sculpture on the death of Cato the Younger, a theme that became popular along with revolutionary sentiment. It depicts Cato reading the Phaedo of Plato, on the death of Socrates, heroically nude as he contemplates his own death. The piece was commissioned in 1832 for the Louvre, but was finished by François Rude after his friend's death.

Roman was an instructor in sculpture at the École des beaux-arts; his vacant place was filled  in 1835, by Louis-Messidor Lebon Petitot,  full professeur  from 1845 to 1862.

List of works
L'Innocence (1822), a nude girl holding a lizard, an emblem of innocence.
 Le peintre Girodet (1827), a portrait bust of Anne-Louis Girodet de Roussy-Trioson (1767–1824)
 Nisus et Euryale (1827)
 Caton d'Utique lisant le Phédon avant de se donner la mort (1832) with François Rude

References
Information not otherwise noted comes from the  Atlas database of the Louvre.

19th-century French sculptors
French male sculptors
Chevaliers of the Légion d'honneur
Prix de Rome for sculpture
Artists from Paris
1792 births
1835 deaths
19th-century French male artists